David Attwood (born 28 August 1952 in Sheffield, South Yorkshire) is an English filmmaker.

Filmography 
1987–1988 Rockliffe 5 eps
1989 Killing Time
1989–1994 The Bill, 18 eps
1995 Saigon Baby
1996 The Fortunes and Misfortunes of Moll Flanders
1998 Shot Through the Heart
2000 Summer in the Suburbs
2002 Fidel
2002 The Hound of the Baskervilles
2004 May 33
2005 To the Ends of the Earth
2007 Stuart: A Life Backwards
2009 Blood Will Flow

References

External links 

1952 births
Living people
English film directors
Film people from Sheffield